The Lakes International Cup was a men's team golf competition between teams of professional golfers from Australia and the United States. It was played four times between 1934 and 1954. The United States won the first three matches with Australia winning the final match in 1954. The Lakes Golf Club staged the inaugural contest in 1934, donating the trophy, and hosted the final stage of the 1952 and 1954 matches.

Trophy
The original trophy had a inscribed silver base with a wooden plinth and a large bowl on top. Only the silver base survives but the bowl and plinth have been recreated.

Format
The 1934 and 1936 matches were contested by teams of six players over two days with three 36-hole foursomes on the first day and six 36-hole singles matches on the second day. The 1952 and 1954 matches had teams of four players and the contest was played at two separate venues. Each half of the contest was over two days with two 36-hole foursomes on the first day and four 36-hole singles matches on the second day, the combined score over the two halves determining the winner.

Results

Appearances
The following are those who played in at least one of the four matches.

Australia
 Billy Bolger 1934, 1936
 Joe Cohen 1934, 1936
 Lou Kelly 1936
 Jim McInnes 1954
 Kel Nagle 1952, 1954
 George Naismith 1936
 Ted Naismith 1934, 1936
 Sam Richardson 1934, 1936
 Ossie Pickworth 1952, 1954
 Don Spence 1934
 Rufus Stewart 1934
 Peter Thomson 1952
 Norman Von Nida 1952, 1954

United States
 Tommy Bolt 1954
 Harry Cooper 1934, 1936
 Jimmy Demaret 1952
 Leo Diegel 1934
 Dave Douglas 1954
 Olin Dutra 1936
 Marty Furgol 1954
 Dutch Harrison 1954
 Ky Laffoon 1934
 Lloyd Mangrum 1952
 Ed Oliver 1952
 Sam Parks Jr. 1936
 Henry Picard 1936
 Paul Runyan 1934, 1936
 Denny Shute 1934
 Horton Smith 1936
 Jim Turnesa 1952
 Craig Wood 1934

In 1954 Ed Furgol was part of the original team of four but withdrew because an injured right arm. He was replaced by Dave Douglas, who flew out as a replacement, arriving in Sydney on 26 October.

References

Team golf tournaments
Recurring sporting events established in 1934
Recurring sporting events disestablished in 1954